APC (formerly known as Australian Personal Computer) is a computer magazine in Australia. It is published monthly and comes with a cover-mounted DVD of software. It is published by Future Australia.

The tagline on the front of the magazine is "high performance personal computing" which APC uses as its point of distinction from other computing publications in Australia, such as PC User which targets beginner-medium users, and Atomic which targets gamers and modders.

APC was first published in May 1980 by Sean Howard and is the longest running computer-magazine in Australia.

The magazine also has a website, which publishes daily technology news, separate to what's in the printed magazine, with very few exceptions.

The magazine was bought from Bauer Media Group in 2013 by Future. Future subsequently incorporated PC & Tech Authority into APC after acquiring it (along with other computing assets) from nextmedia in 2018.

Cover disc 

APC has a cover-mounted DVD each month containing a variety of software, which typically includes sample code, programs demonstrated in the magazine's Workshop pages, instructional videos, trial versions of new software and game releases and three to four "full-working versions" of programs that are no longer current editions.

APC first included a cover CD on its September 1996 issue. On its December 2004 issue, APC switched to DVD instead of CD and was the first IT publication in Australia to do so.

It is currently edited and produced by Peter Dockrill, who has worked on it since April 2008.

References

External links 

1980 establishments in Australia
ACP magazine titles
Computer magazines published in Australia
Monthly magazines published in Australia
Magazines established in 1980
Magazines published in Sydney